Madranges is a commune in the Corrèze department in central France in the Nouvelle-Aquitaine region.

Geography

Location
A commune of the Massif Central situated on the Plateau de Millevaches in the Regional Nature Park of Millevaches in Limousin. It is watered by the streams of the Boulou and the Madrange, two tributaries of the Vézère river.

Neighbouring municipalities

Population

See also
Communes of the Corrèze department

References

Communes of Corrèze